Celine Lundbye Kristiansen (born 24 May 1996) is a Danish handball player who plays for København Håndbold and the Danish national team.

International honours 
Danish Championship:
Winner: 2017

References

1996 births
Living people
People from Gentofte Municipality
Danish female handball players
Nykøbing Falster Håndboldklub players
Sportspeople from the Capital Region of Denmark